

Taxonomy
Boletus viscidocorrugis is a fungus of the genus Boletus native to North America. It was described scientifically by Ernst Both in 1998.

Description
Cap slimy, very wrinkled, orange-brown; pore surface white to pale yellow becoming olive, not bruising; stem whitish to brownish, with white scabers that do not darken in age; flesh white, staining pink on exposure; cap bright red with ammonia; spores 14-19 µ long; found on ground under oak Quercus rubra and among or on decayed leaves; known only from western New York.

See also
List of Boletus species

References

External links
 

viscidocorrugis
Fungi described in 1998
Fungi of North America